Đỗ Thị Hà (born July 20, 2001) is a Vietnamese economics student, model and beauty pageant titleholder who was crowned Miss Vietnam 2020. She was selected to represent Vietnam at the Miss World 2021 pageant.

Early life and education
Đỗ Thị Hà was born in 2001 in Cầu Village, Cầu Lộc Commune, Hậu Lộc District, Thanh Hóa Province, the youngest in a purely agricultural family with three siblings.

She is currently studying economics at National Economics University in Hanoi.

Pageantry

Miss Vietnam 2020
She was crowned Miss Vietnam 2020 on November 20, 2020 at the Phu Tho Indoor Stadium in Ho Chi Minh City. She succeeded outgoing by Miss Vietnam 2018, Trần Tiểu Vy. During the pageant, she entered the top 5 of Fast Track Beach Beauty and Top Model and won the Multimedia award.

Miss World 2021
Hà was selected to represent Vietnam at the Miss World 2021 pageant, to be held on 16 March 2022 at Coca-Cola Music Hall, San Juan, Puerto Rico. She placed among the top 13 finalists, achieving Vietnam's fourth consecutive streak in the Miss World pageant.

References

External links

2001 births
Living people
Miss World 2021 delegates
Miss Vietnam winners
People from Thanh Hóa province
Vietnamese beauty pageant winners
Vietnamese female models
21st-century Vietnamese women